Martina Devlin is a columnist and novelist from Northern Ireland.

Biography
Devlin was born in Omagh, County Tyrone, Northern Ireland. She worked in Fleet Street for seven years before moving to Dublin. In England, she studied journalism, followed by a degree in English Literature at the University of London (Birkbeck College). After working as a journalist for the Press Association, Devlin went to Trinity College, Dublin where she completed an MPhil in Anglo-Irish Literature followed by a PhD in literary practice, also at Trinity College. Afterwards, she combined working as a columnist for the Irish Independent in Dublin with writing novels. Devlin does not write by genre. Four of her books are historical fiction and another is speculative fiction.

She has written of her unsuccessful efforts at IVF and the toll it took on her marriage. In 2012 she married RTE journalist David Murphy.

She was vice-chairperson of the Irish Writers Centre and holds a diploma in company direction from the Institute of Directors.
She is a board member of Ireland's Future.

Awards

Devlin has won numerous awards for both her writing and journalism.
 1996 Hennessy Literary Award for her first short story
 2009 Writer-in-residence at the Princess Grace Irish Library in Monaco
 2010 GALA columnist of the year
 2011 National Newspapers of Ireland columnist of the year
 2012 Royal Society of Literature's VS Pritchett short story award for her short story Singing Dumb.

She has been shortlisted three times for the Irish Book of the Year awards. Her non fiction account of the Irish financial collapse, Banksters, co-authored with David Murphy, topped the best seller list for eight weeks.

Bibliography

Fiction
 Three Wise Men (London, HarperCollins, 2000)
 Be Careful What You Wish For (HarperCollins, 2001)
 Venus Reborn (Dublin, Poolbeg Press, 2003)
 Temptation (Poolbeg Press, 2004)
 Ship of Dreams (Poolbeg Press, 2007)
 The House Where It Happened (Ward River Press, 2015)
 About Sisterland (Ward River Press, 2015)
 Truth & Dare: Short Stories About Women Who Shaped Ireland (Poolbeg Press, 2018)
 Edith-a novel (Lilliput Press, 2022)
 Call Me Madame (Arlen House, 2022)

Theatre work includes Call Me Madame, a political satire featuring Countess Markievicz. Another play, 'Curves of Emotion', about James Joyce and Nora Barnacle, was written to commission to mark the Ulysses centenary in 2022.
She lectures in Irish literature for Boston University in Dublin and has also taught Irish literature for Trinity College Dublin and Palacky University in the Czech Republic.

Non-fiction
 The Hollow Heart: The True Story of How One Woman’s Desire to Have a Baby Almost Destroyed Her Life (London, Penguin Books, 2005)
 Banksters, with David Murphy (Dublin, Hachette Books Ireland, 2009).

References

External links 
 Homepage
 Book launch

Women_novelists_from_Northern_Ireland
Year of birth missing (living people)
Living people
People from Omagh